The 9th Indie Series Awards were held on April 4, 2018 at The Colony Theatre in Los Angeles, with the ceremony hosted by Emmy Award-winner Patrika Darbo. Presented by We Love Soaps, the awards recognize independently produced, scripted entertainment created for the web.

Ladies of the Lake led all series with 18 total nominations, followed by The Bay with 16. Filth City led all comedies with 12 nominations. The first ever category for unscripted shows was added this year.

Awards 
The awards were given on April 4, 2017. Winners are listed first and highlighted in boldface:

References

External links 

 Indie Series Awards History and Archive of Past Winners

Indie Series Awards
2018 film awards